Baumanis (feminine: Baumane) is a Latvian surname of German origin (from German surname Baumann). Individuals with the surname include:

Arnolds Baumanis, Latvian sport wrestler
Hardijs Baumanis (1967–2015), Latvian diplomat
Herberts Baumanis, Latvian sprinter
Jānis Baumanis (born 1992), Latvian racing driver
Jānis Frīdrihs Baumanis (1834–1891), Latvian architect
Kārlis Baumanis (1835–1905), Latvian classical composer
Rudolfs Baumanis (1909–1998), Latvian sport shooter
Valdemārs Baumanis (1905–1992), Latvian basketball player and coach

Latvian-language masculine surnames
Surnames of German origin